Lennart Pettersson may refer to:

 Lennart Pettersson (pentathlete) (born 1951), Swedish Air Force officer and modern pentathlete
 Lennart Pettersson (footballer), Swedish footballer